Night Flight from Moscow (also known as The Serpent) (French: Le Serpent) is a 1973 French-Italian-West German Cold War spy-thriller film that was produced, cowritten and directed by Henri Verneuil and starred Yul Brynner, Henry Fonda, Dirk Bogarde and Philippe Noiret. The score was composed by Ennio Morricone.

Plot
Aleksey Teodorovic Vlassov (Yul Brynner), a high-ranking KGB official who defects while he is in France, has highly classified information as part of a deal with Western intelligence for his arrival in the United States. The debriefing is held at Langley by DCI Allan Davies (Henry Fonda) and MI6 representative Philip Boyle (Dirk Bogarde). Vlassov hands a list that he has of enemy agents in Western Europe, including a deep penetration into NATO.

Davies wants to begin operations to arrest the agents, but those on the list suddenly begin to die off. The CIA also has suspicions over the authenticity of Vlassov's claims. The CIA discovers that a defection photo of Vlassov had been taken in the Soviet Union, not in Turkey, because of the contours of Mount Ararat in the background. Vlassov outsmarted a lie detector test of the CIA by telling a minor lie to cover his real intentions.

Cast

Yul Brynner as Aleksey Teodorovic Vlassov 
Henry Fonda as Allan Davies
Dirk Bogarde as Philip Boyle 
Philippe Noiret as Lucien Berthon 
Michel Bouquet as Tavel 
Martin Held as Lepke 
Virna Lisi as Annabel Lee
Paola Pitagora as Jeannine Santelli
Elga Andersen as Kate Cross
Marie Dubois as Suzanne
 Nathalie Nerval as Tatiana Vlassov
Farley Granger as Computer Programming Director
Luigi Diberti as Lefevre
Robert Alda as Man interrogated by Tavel

Reception
The film received mixed reviews. A contemporary review by Tony Mastroianni in the Cleveland Press stated that the film demonstrated how in 1973, the computer had replaced the dagger in espionage. The reviewer also concluded the film had "more good moments than bad". Time Out called it "a very traditional spy fable" and "the only thing that sets this film apart is the totally consistent layer of impenetrable gloss with which Verneuil covers it, and his general directorial tricksiness, which runs the gamut from the irrelevant to the pretentious and back"> TV Guide described it as "a solid international espionage tale" and added that "this is a gritty, tightly directed look at international intrigue, and the performances are all finely tuned. Particularly effective is Bogarde who offers a insightful portrait of a cool, calculating agent".

References

External links

 
Trailer

1973 films
1970s spy thriller films
1970s psychological thriller films
French spy thriller films
Italian spy thriller films
West German films
Films directed by Henri Verneuil
Cold War spy films
Films scored by Ennio Morricone
Films set in France
Films set in West Germany
Films set in London
Films set in Virginia
English-language French films
English-language German films
English-language Italian films
Mount Ararat
Films about the Central Intelligence Agency
Films about the KGB
Films about the Secret Intelligence Service
Films set in Langley, Virginia
1970s French films
1970s Italian films